The NamX HUV (for Hydrogen Utility Vehicle) is a hydrogen-powered coupe SUV
. It was designed by Faouzi Annajah, the founder, CEO and chief engineer of the company and Pininfarina.

Overview
The NamX HUV was presented for the first time on May 11, 2022 in Italy and in October at the 2022 Paris Motor Show. It is the result of four years of development and collaboration between the Italian coachbuilder Pininfarina and NamX (which stands for New Automotive and Mobility Exploration).

Features
The HUV has the particularity of offering interchangeable hydrogen tanks. This system makes it easy to exchange the six removable tanks in a station without refueling the main tank, service stations for hydrogen being rare.

Powertrain
The SUV has a fuel cell that generates electricity from hydrogen powering the electric motor(s). In the rear-wheel drive version, it has a 300 hp engine while the all-wheel drive version has two engines for a combined power of 550 hp.

References

2020s cars
Upcoming car models
Concept cars
First car made by manufacturer
Car models
All-wheel-drive vehicles
Sport utility vehicles